Jaksonek  is a village in the administrative district of Gmina Aleksandrów, within Piotrków County, Łódź Voivodeship, in central Poland.

The village has a population of 180.

References

Jaksonek